Qargi, Qasgi or Qasgiq (by the Yup'iks), Qaygiq (by the Cup'iks), Kashim (by the Russians), Kariyit, a traditional large semi-subterranean men's community house' (or "communal men's house, men's house, ceremonial house, council house, dance house, communal gathering place") of the Yup'ik and Inuit, also Deg Hit'an Athabaskans (at Anvik, Alaska), was used for public and ceremonial occasions and as a men’s residence. The Qargi was the place where men built their boats, repaired their equipment, took sweat baths, educated young boys, and hosted community dances. Here people learned their oral history, songs and chants. Young boys and men learned to make tools and weapons while they listened to the traditions of their forefathers.

The qargi was almost always a separate building because the dwellings were not large enough to hold very many men. The qargi was a combination courthouse, church, workshop, dance hall, and received center, two or three times the size of a typical house. It was the place where the storytelling, dancing, singing, and games (high-kick games) that so enriched Yupik and Inuit life took place. The qargi was a communal building in which women were usually not permitted.

Prior to the arrival of Christian missionaries in the 1890s, every Inupiaq settlement had one or more of these ceremonial houses.

Naming

School 
In many Iñupiat communities the qargi was the first institution to vanish as churches and schools became the dominant forces of change. At present, Iñupiat elders have no responsibility for the formal education of young Iñupiat. According to MacLean, Western education and Iñupiat qargi need not be competitive institutions but should complement each other.

Before 1950, formal education for students in Chevak, Alaska took place in the qaygiq, and in the homes of the people. The information taught to students in the qaygiq included history, values, rules, regulations, and survival methods.

See also
 Bladder Festival

References

External links 
Alaska Native Heritage Center
http://vilda.alaska.edu/cdm/singleitem/collection/cdmg21/id/844/rec/3

Yupik culture
House types
Inuit culture
Buildings and structures in North America
Traditional Native American dwellings
Semi-subterranean structures